The 2004 Copa Colsanitas Seguros Bolivar was a women's tennis tournament played on outdoor clay courts at the Club Campestre El Rancho in Bogotá, Colombia that was part of Tier III of the 2004 WTA Tour. It was the seventh edition of the tournament and ran from 23 February through 29 February 2004. First-seeded Fabiola Zuluaga won her third consecutive singles title, and fourth in total, at the event and earned $27,000 first-prize money.

Finals

Singles

 Fabiola Zuluaga defeated  María Sánchez Lorenzo 3–6, 6–4, 6–2
 It was Zuluaga's 1st singles title of the year and the 6th of her career.

Doubles

 Barbara Schwartz /  Jasmin Wöhr defeated  Anabel Medina Garrigues /  Arantxa Parra Santonja 6–1, 6–3

References

External links
 Official website 
 Official website 
 ITF tournament edition details
 Tournament draws

Copa Colsanitas
Copa Colsanitas
2004 in Colombian tennis